Duncan James Dormor (born 27 February 1967) is a priest in the Church of England. Since January 2018, he has been the General Secretary of the United Society Partners in the Gospel, the Anglican mission agency founded in 1701. He was Dean of St John's College, Cambridge, from 2002 to 2017.

Early life and career

Dormor studied Human Sciences (BA) at Magdalen College, Oxford, graduating in 1988, before studying for a Master of Science in Medical Demography at the London School of Hygiene and Tropical Medicine. Following this, he worked as an Information and Press Officer for the charity One Plus One Marriage and Partnership Research.

Ordained ministry

Dormor trained for ordination at Ripon College Cuddesdon studying for Theology (BA) at Magdalen College, Oxford, and was ordained a deacon in the Church of England in 1995 and as a priest in 1996. He served as a curate at St Peter’s Collegiate Church in the Parish of Central Wolverhampton within the Diocese of Lichfield from 1995 to 1998.

St John’s College, Cambridge

Dormor served as Chaplain of St John's College, Cambridge, from 1998 to 2002, when he was appointed Dean of Chapel. He served 15 years as Dean and was succeeded by the Revd Canon Mark Oakley in 2018. From 2011 to 2015, Dormor served as the elected President of the College. Dormor taught anthropology and sociology of religion in the Faculty of Divinity and represented Cambridge University on the General Synod of the Church of England. He was a Trustee of the Churches Conservation Trust from 2013 to 2019

Together with Andrew Nethsingha, Dormor pioneered webcasting choral services. The Choir of St John's College held the UK’s first webcast choral service on 14 October 2008. During his time at Cambridge, Dormor published on LGBT issues within the Church.

USPG

In 2018, Dormor was appointed General Secretary of USPG, succeeding Janette O’Neill who retired after serving six years in the role. He was commissioned by the Most Reverend Justin Welby, Archbishop of Canterbury at a service at Lambeth Palace on 12 February 2019. He is a Trustee of the ACF Anglican Communion Fund.

As General Secretary of USPG, Dormor has taken part in difficult conversations around subjects such as the idea of the White savior complex. He is also on the Editorial Board of Modern Believing, the journal of Modern Church.

Bibliography

Books
 Dormor, Duncan; Macdonald, Jack and Caddick, Jeremy (eds). Anglicanism: The Answer to Modernity (2003). (2003). London: Continuum. .
 Dormor, Duncan. Just Cohabiting: The Church, Sex and Getting Married (2004) London: DLT. .
 Dormor, Duncan; Morris, Jeremy (eds). An Acceptable Sacrifice? Homosexuality and the Church (2007). London: SPCK. .
 Dormor, Duncan; Harris, Alana (eds). Evanglii Gaudium, Pope Francis and the Renewal of the Church (2017). Mahwah, NJ: Paulist Press. .

References 

1967 births

Living people
Church of England priests
Alumni of Magdalen College, Oxford
Alumni of the London School of Hygiene & Tropical Medicine
Alumni of Ripon College Cuddesdon
Fellows of St John's College, Cambridge